In This Corner is a 1948 American sports drama film directed by Charles Reisner and starring Scott Brady, Anabel Shaw and James Millican.

Plot

Cast
 Scott Brady as Jimmy Weston 
 Anabel Shaw as Sally Rivers 
 James Millican as Charles 'Tug' Martin 
 Mary Meade as Birdie Bronson 
 Charles D. Brown as Victor 'Doc' Fuller 
 Cy Kendall as Tiny Reed 
 John Indrisano as Johnny Hart 
 Robert Bice as Navy Commander Harris 
 John Hamilton as Admiral in Harris' Office 
 John Doucette as Dunkle 
 Cliff Clark as CPO Mike Burke 
 Bill Kennedy as Al Barton 
 Tommy Garland as Paddy Dillon 
 Dave Shilling as Whitey, Dillon's Trainer 
 Renny McEvoy as Matt McGuire 
 Don Forbes as TV Sportscaster 
 Ralph Dunn as Gus

References

Bibliography
 William H. Young & Nancy K. Young. World War II and the Postwar Years in America: A-I. ABC-CLIO, 2010.

External links

1948 films
American sports drama films
American black-and-white films
1940s sports drama films
American boxing films
Films directed by Charles Reisner
Eagle-Lion Films films
1948 drama films
1940s English-language films
1940s American films